Sisyracera contortilinealis is a moth in the family Crambidae. It is found on Puerto Rico, Dominica, Grenada, Jamaica, Cuba and in Guyana.

References

Moths described in 1895
Pyraustinae
Moths of the Caribbean
Moths of South America